Jill Christine King (born April 2, 1973, in Arab, Alabama) is an American country music artist. A graduate of Vanderbilt University, she spent several years in Nashville, Tennessee, before being discovered at Tootsie's Orchid Lounge, a popular venue for singer-songwriters in Nashville.

In 2003, she released her debut album, Jillbilly, on the independent Blue Diamond label. The album's first and third singles both entered Billboard Hot Country Singles & Tracks (now Hot Country Songs) charts. Several of her singles have also charted on the independent Music Row music charts as well. Her 2008 single "Somebody New" is a cover of a song previously recorded by Billy Ray Cyrus.

King founded her own label, Foundher Records, in 2010. She released her third album, Rain on Fire, that same year.

Discography

Albums

Singles

Music videos

References

External links
JillKing.com

1975 births
Living people
People from Arab, Alabama
American women country singers
American country singer-songwriters
Vanderbilt University alumni
21st-century American singers
21st-century American women singers
Country musicians from Alabama
Singer-songwriters from Alabama